Other Worlds Than Ours is a collection of science fiction short stories by Nelson Bond. It was released in 2005 by Arkham House in an edition of approximately 2,000 copies.  It was the author's third book published by Arkham House following Nightmares and Daydreams (1968) and The Far Side of Nowhere (2002).  The stories originally appeared in the magazines Astounding, Thrilling Wonder Stories, Planet Stories and Blue Book.

Contents

Other Worlds Than Ours contains the following tales:

 "The Fifth Dimension"
 "Legacy"
 "Luxury Liner"
 "Phantom Out of Time"
 "Revolt on Io"
 "Jessifer Rides Again"
 "Siblings of the Sun"
 "Shadrach"
 "Martian Caravan"
 "Wanderers of the Wolf Moon"
 "The Squared Circle"
 "Gods of the Jungle"
 "Order Out of Chaos"
 "Colossus of Chaos"
 "Pawns of Chaos"
 "Captain Chaos"
 "Postscript to the Future"
 "The Ultimate Salient"

References

 

2005 short story collections
Science fiction short story collections by Nelson Bond
Arkham House books